The Rod and ring symbol is a symbol that is depicted on Mesopotamian stelas, cylinder seals and reliefs. It is held by a god or goddess and in most cases is being offered to a king who is standing, often making a sacrifice, or otherwise showing respect. The symbol dates from the Ur III period to the Neo-Assyrian period, and is commonly explained as a coil of measuring string and a yardstick. Other theories are that they are a shepherd's crook and a nose rope, or that the ring is no rope at all.

The best known example of the symbol is seen on the Code of Hammurabi stela. The symbol is also illustrated in the 'Investiture Scene' painted at the palace of Mari. The most elaborate depiction is found on the  Ur-Nammu-stela, where the winding of the cords has been detailed by the sculptor. This has also been described as a "staff and a chaplet of beads". There is discussion whether the Ur-Nammu-stela is showing the same thing.

Scepter, throne, and ring: Enuma Elish
The myth of Inanna's descent to the nether world describes how the goddess dresses and prepares herself: "She held the lapis-lazuli measuring rod and measuring line in her hand."

In tablet IV of the Enuma Elish, the rod and ring symbol is referenced as:
"They rejoiced, and they did homage unto him, saying, "Marduk is King!"They bestowed upon him the scepter, and the throne, and the ring.They gave him an invincible weaponry which overwhelmeth the foe."

Symbols that appear similar 
The Egyptian Shen ring has an identical resemblance. 
The Greek goddess Nike uses a different type of investiture symbol for the victor in the sporting races, a wreath of laurel, or a wreath of olive branches, but she is depicted with a ring, a rigid circle. 
The Faravahar, the symbol of Zoroastrianism, also holds a ring. 
The Egyptian Ankh has a vaguely similar form and is also depicted in hands of gods.
At the 6th century B.C.E. archaeological site of Cancho Roano, located near Zalamea de la Serena, Badajoz, Spain, a large feature in the shape of the rod and ring symbol was modeled into the floor of the innermost chamber of a Tartessian temple. 
This symbol also bears a resemblance to an ancient rune called a Thurisaz or thorn, which means "frost giant" or "giant".

Notes

References
Black, Jeremy; Green, Anthony. Gods, Demons and Symbols of Ancient Mesopotamia, an Illustrated Dictionary, by Jeremy Black and Anthony Green, c 1992, (3rd printing 1997), University of Texas Press, Austin, p 156 (softcover)
Jacobsen, Thorkild (1987) "Pictures and pictorial language (the Burney Relief)". In: M. Mindlin, M.J. Geller and J.E. Wansbrough, eds., Figurative Language in the Ancient Near East, 1-11. (1987) London: University of London School of Oriental and African Studies. 
 Arthur E. Whatham, The Meaning of the Ring and Rod in Babylonian-Assyrian Sculpture,  The Biblical World, Vol. 26, No. 2 (Aug., 1905), pp. 120–123.

External links
Inana's descent to the nether world at Electronic Text Corpus of Sumerian Literature
The Enûma Elish

Iconography
Enūma Eliš
Ancient Near East art and architecture
Regalia